KBSB (89.7 FM, "FM 90") is a radio station licensed to Bemidji, Minnesota, United States, airing a College radio format.  The station is owned by Bemidji State University.

References

External links
FM 90 official website

College radio stations in Minnesota
Radio stations established in 1970